Yuri Kharchenko (born October 11, 1963) is a Soviet luger who competed during the mid to late 1980s. He won the bronze medal in the men's singles event at the 1988 Winter Olympics in Calgary.

Kharchenko also won a bronze in the mixed team event at the 1989 FIL World Luge Championships in Winterberg, West Germany. His best overall finish in the Luge World Cup was second in the men's singles in 1987-8.

References
DatabaseOlympics.com profile (As Yury Kharchenko).
Fuzilogik Sports - Winter Olympic results - Men's luge
Hickoksports.com results on Olympic champions in luge and skeleton.
Hickok sports information on World champions in luge and skeleton.
List of men's singles luge World Cup champions since 1978.

1963 births
Living people
People from Vyborg District
Lugers at the 1984 Winter Olympics
Lugers at the 1988 Winter Olympics
Russian male lugers
Soviet male lugers
Olympic lugers of the Soviet Union
Olympic medalists in luge
Medalists at the 1988 Winter Olympics
Olympic bronze medalists for the Soviet Union
Sportspeople from Leningrad Oblast